Daniel "Dani" Rebollo Franco (born 10 December 1999) is a Spanish footballer who plays as a goalkeeper for Real Zaragoza.

Club career
Born in Lepe, Huelva, Andalusia, Rebollo joined Real Betis' youth setup in 2017, from UD Punta del Caimán. He made his senior debut with the reserves on 25 February 2018, starting in a 2–1 Segunda División B home loss against CF Villanovense.

On 23 October 2019, Rebollo renewed his contract until 2022. On 21 March 2021, he scored a stoppage time equalizer in a 2–1 away win over Córdoba CF.

On 8 July 2022, free agent Rebollo agreed to a one-year deal with Segunda División side Real Zaragoza. Initially a third-choice behind Cristian Álvarez and Álvaro Ratón, he made his professional debut on 10 December, starting in a 3–0 home success over SD Huesca.

References

External links

2000 births
Living people
People from the Province of Huelva
Spanish footballers
Footballers from Andalusia
Association football goalkeepers
Segunda División players
Primera Federación players
Segunda División B players
Segunda Federación players
Tercera División players
Betis Deportivo Balompié footballers
Real Zaragoza B players
Real Zaragoza players